William Irwin or Bill Irwin may refer to:

Bill Irwin (wrestler) (born 1954), American professional wrestler
Bill Irwin (born 1950), American actor and clown
Bill Irwin (footballer) (born 1951), Northern Irish ex-footballer
Billy Irwin (Australian rules footballer) (1884–1946), Australian footballer
Bill Irwin (priest) (1928–2004), Canadian priest
Bill Irwin (baseball) (1859–1933), baseball player
Bill Irwin (skier) (1920–2013), former Canadian skier
Will Irwin (1873–1948), American author
William Irwin (California politician) (1827–1886), California politician from the Democratic Party
William Andrew Irwin (1884–1967), theologian
William Arthur Irwin (1898–1999), Canadian journalist and diplomat
William C. K. Irwin (1907–1998), a.k.a. Will Irwin, American pianist, conductor, and songwriter
William Irwin (philosopher) (born 1970), professor of philosophy at King's College in Wilkes-Barre, Pennsylvania
William Irwin (boxer) (born 1968), Canadian boxer
William Irwin (Unionist politician) (born 1956), Unionist politician in Northern Ireland
William W. Irwin (1803–1856), Mayor of Pittsburgh
William W. Irvin or Irwin (1778–1842), Ohio politician
William Roy Irwin (1898–1969), Canadian-born World War I flying ace

See also
Bill Erwin (1914-2010) American character actor
William Irvin (disambiguation)
William Irvine (disambiguation)
William Irving (disambiguation)
William Irwin Thompson (born 1938), social philosopher, cultural critic and poet
Irwin (surname)